Adian Yuryevich Pitkeev (born 16 May 1998) is a Russian former figure skater. The 2015 Russian national bronze medalist, he has won one medal on the Grand Prix series and two on the ISU Challenger Series. On the junior level, he is the 2014 World Junior silver medalist, the 2013–14 JGP Final silver medalist, and the 2013 European Youth Olympic champion.

Personal life 
Adian  Pitkeev was born on 16 May 1998 in Moscow.

Career 
After watching Alexei Yagudin at the 2002 Olympics, Pitkeev expressed interest in skating to his mother, who brought him to an ice rink. Olga Volobueva coached him until 2009. He then joined Eteri Tutberidze's group at Olympic School No. 37.

2012–13 season 
Pitkeev debuted internationally in the 2012–13 season, placing sixth in the United States and eighth in Slovenia on the Junior Grand Prix (JGP) series. At the Russian Nationals, he was 15th in his senior-level debut and then fourth behind Alexander Petrov on the junior level. He won the gold medal at the 2013 European Youth Olympic Festival.

2013–14 season 
In the 2013–14 season, Pitkeev won the silver medal in Riga, Latvia, and then gold in Gdańsk, Poland competing on the 2013 JGP series. He qualified for his first Junior Grand Prix Final and won the silver medal in Fukuoka, Japan. At the Russian Championships, Pitkeev placed fifth in his second appearance on the senior level and then won the junior title, finishing 1.88 points ahead of Petrov. At the 2014 World Junior Championships, Pitkeev won the silver medal after placing seventh in the short and second in the free skate.

2014–15 season 
Pitkeev began the 2014–15 season with a bronze medal at the 2014  Lombardia Trophy, an ISU Challenger Series (CS) event and his first senior international. He finished sixth at both of his Grand Prix assignments, the 2014 Skate America and 2014 Trophée Éric Bompard. Having won the bronze medal at the Russian Nationals, he was selected to compete at the 2015 European Championships and finished 7th. Returning to junior competition, he placed 5th overall, just ahead of teammate Alexander Petrov, at the 2015 World Junior Championships in Tallinn, Estonia.

2015–16 season
Pitkeev started the 2015–16 season on the Challenger Series, placing fourth at the 2015 Ondrej Nepela Trophy. A recipient of two Grand Prix invitations, he placed 5th at the 2015 Skate America before winning his first GP medal, silver, at the 2015 Rostelecom Cup. In December, he was awarded the bronze medal at a CS event, the 2015 Golden Spin of Zagreb, behind Adam Rippon of the United States. Later that month, he placed 3rd in the short, 11th in the free, and 9th overall at the 2016 Russian Championships. He competed with a back injury at the Russian nationals and had to take painkillers. He later underwent treatment in Germany, the United States, and Russia.

In March 2016, Pitkeev left his longtime coaches, Eteri Tutberidze and Sergei Dudakov, to train at CSKA Moscow under Elena Buianova.

Later career
On 13 September, Pitkeev withdrew from both of his 2016–17 Grand Prix assignments, the Trophée de France and NHK Trophy, due to his back injury. In December, Buianova said that he was continuing treatment and had not yet returned to the ice.

In late June, Pitkeev announced his retirement from singles skating due to chronic back injuries and that he would switch to ice dance. It was later announced that he teamed up with Alisa Lozko and that the team would be coached by Elena Ilinykh. They never competed together.

In a 2017 interview, Pitkeev said that a slight congenital spinal deformity may have contributed to his back problems.

Programs

Competitive highlights 
GP: Grand Prix; CS: Challenger Series; JGP: Junior Grand Prix

Detailed results

References

External links 

 
 

1998 births
Russian male single skaters
World Junior Figure Skating Championships medalists
Living people
Figure skaters from Moscow